Andreu Ballbé García (born 31 October 1952 in Barcelona, Catalonia) is a former middle-distance runner from Spain. He represented his native country at the 1976 Summer Olympics in Montreal, Quebec, Canada. There, he was eliminated in the heats of the 800 metres, clocking 1:48.38. Best time in 800 meters is 1:46:59. It was a Catalan record for 26 years.

References

External links 
sports-reference

Living people
1952 births
Spanish male middle-distance runners
Athletes (track and field) at the 1976 Summer Olympics
Olympic athletes of Spain
Athletes from Barcelona
20th-century Spanish people